The Senior PGA Championship, established in 1937, is the oldest of the five major championships in men's senior golf. It is administered by the Professional Golfers' Association of America and is recognized as a major championship by both PGA Tour Champions and the European Senior Tour. It was formerly an unofficial money event on the European Senior Tour, but since 2007 has been an official money event. Winners gain entry into the next PGA Championship. The winners prior to 1980, the first season of the senior tour, are not considered major champions of this event by the PGA Tour Champions.

The lower age limit is 50, which is the standard limit for men's senior professional golf tournaments. Like its PGA Tour counterpart, the Senior PGA Championship allows club professionals to enter. The tournament committee gives former winners of the PGA Professional National Championship a one time invitation upon turning 50 years of age and the top 35 club professionals who qualify through the Senior PGA Professional National Championship.

History
The inaugural event was played  in 1937 at Augusta National Golf Club, with 54-year-old Jock Hutchison winning the 54-hole event on Thursday, December 2. The second edition at Augusta was reduced to 36 holes due to rain, but had an 18-hole playoff on December 9 to decide the winner, Fred McLeod. The next edition was moved to Florida in January, No tournaments were held in 1943 and 1944 due to World War II. The event returned in 1945 at the PGA National Golf Course, where it stayed until 1962. The event moved to different courses in Florida through 2000. Due to scheduling moves, two tournaments were played in 1979 and 1984 and none in 1983, and 1985.
It moved from winter to mid-April in 1990 and when it rotated to various sites in 2001, it became a late spring event, played in late May or early June.

It was a 36-hole event until 1954; after four years at 54 holes, it became a 72-hole event in 1958. In the past, the event has had long spells of playing on a single host course, but currently it is played on a different course each year.

Eligibility
Here is who may be eligible to compete in the Senior PGA Championship (provided they meet the age requirement):
Any past winner of the Senior PGA Championship
Any past winner of a regular major championship
Any past member of the United States Ryder Cup team
The top 15 finishers in the previous year's Senior PGA Championship
The top 50 on the PGA Tour Champions money list (previous year and current year)
Any winner of a PGA Tour Champions event since the last Senior PGA Championship
The top 35 finishers from the Callaway Golf Senior PGA Professional National Championship
Any winner of the previous five U.S. Senior Opens
The winner of the previous five Senior Open Championship
The top eight players from the previous year's European Senior Tour Order of Merit
The top four players from the previous year's Japanese Seniors Tour Order of Merit
A one-time exemption for those who have just turned 50 and have won a PGA Tour, Japan Golf Tour, or European Tour event in the last 5 years
The top 30 on the career money list, both PGA Tour Champions and combined PGA Tour Champions and PGA Tour
A one-time exemption for former PGA Professional National Champions turning 50
Invitations for those not meeting criteria above also are made

Tournament hosts

Winners

Source:

Multiple winners
The following men have won the Senior PGA Championship more than once, through 2021:

6 wins: Sam Snead (1964, 1965, 1967, 1970, 1972, 1973)
4 wins: Hale Irwin (1996, 1997, 1998, 2004)
3 wins: Eddie Williams (1942, 1945, 1946), Al Watrous (1950, 1951, 1957), Gary Player (1986, 1988, 1990)
2 wins: Jock Hutchison (1937, 1947), Gene Sarazen (1954, 1958), Paul Runyan (1961, 1962), Julius Boros (1971, 1977), Don January (1979, 1982),  Arnold Palmer (1980, 1984), Lee Trevino (1992, 1994), Jay Haas (2006, 2008), Tom Watson (2001, 2011), Colin Montgomerie (2014, 2015)

Winners of both PGA Championship and Senior PGA Championship
The following men have won both the PGA Championship and the Senior PGA Championship, the majors run by the PGA of America:

Final round ratings
2019: 1.190 million on NBC

Future tournament sites

 PGA Frisco is also slated to host in 2029.
 Congressional Country Club is also slated to host in 2033.
Source

See also
Golf in the United States

References

External links

PGA Tour Champions events
Recurring sporting events established in 1937
1937 establishments in Georgia (U.S. state)